Duck Bamboo Curry (popularly known as ) is one kind of curry made of duck and bamboo shoot, is a popular food in the Sylhet region of Bangladesh. This is one of the traditional and delicious dishes in Bengali cuisine. Although it is not as common in all areas as a curry.

Though it is not exactly clear who started eating bamboo shoots as food for the first time, many historical data shows that the Chinese started eating it since long ago. This dish is eaten with Tandoor bread as well. Hash Bash curry is less spicy in taste.

Ingredients 
Duck, bamboo shoots, various types of spices such as sliced onion, paste of garlic and ginger, cumin, garam masala, turmeric, chilli powder, panch phoron and salt, as well as yogurt, tomato, mustard seeds and a little amount of almond, green pepper and cinnamon.

Procedure 
Oil is heated first in a frypan before adding sliced onion to it. When the onion becomes a little soft, the ginger, garlic, almonds and mustard is poured and stirred. When it is slightly fried then the rest of ingredient is to be seasoned with spices. After that, adding some water, the boneless duck flesh should be poured into the pan. When the meat is cooked, reducing heat of the cooker it's required to add some peppers and bamboo shoots and cover the pot for a while. Then the mixture is removed from the stove by spreading panch phoron and mix powdered milk with water as required.

See also 
 Bangladeshi cuisine
 List of duck dishes

References 

Sylheti cuisine
Duck dishes
Stem vegetables
Curry dishes